Charles Chewings (16 April 1859 – 9 June 1937) was an Australian geologist and anthropologist.

Early life
Charles Chewings was born the third son of John Chewings, a pastoralist, and his wife Sarah (née Wall) at Woorkongoree station, near Burra, South Australia. He was educated by a tutor and at Prince Alfred College, Adelaide. After engaging in sheep farming, Chewings travelled to the Finke River in Central Australia in 1881 with two camels and found them so useful that he imported more of them and started a carrying business. He gave some account of his explorations in his The Sources of the Finke River (1886). Chewings married Miss F. M. Braddock in 1887, and they had two sons and two daughters.

Career
Chewings went to Europe in 1888 and studied geology at University College London and University of Heidelberg, obtaining the degree of Ph.D. After returning to Australia, Chewings worked in Western Australia reporting on mines before going back to South Australia to resume camel carrying. He was much interested in the Indigenous Australians and made a careful study of them.

Chewings was very interested by the discovery of marine fossils on Tempe Downs station by his manager F. Thornton and in 1891 published "Geological notes on the Upper Finke Basin" in the Transactions and Proceedings of the Royal Society of South Australia. He listed the fossils and began a tentative interpretation of the region's succession of rock strata. Chewings became a mining consultant in Coolgardie, Western Australia, in 1894, and later worked in Central Australia for almost 20 years.

Late life
After the First World War, Chewings retired to Adelaide and contributed several more scientific papers relating to central Australia to the Transactions. He worked on a dictionary of the Aranda language and towards the end of 1936 published a popular book on the Indigenous Australians titled Back in the Stone Age. He died on 9 June 1937 and was buried in West Terrace Cemetery. Chewings was a fellow of the Geological Society of London and of the Berlin Geological Society.

References

Hans Mincham, "Chewings, Charles (1859 - 1937)", Australian Dictionary of Biography, Volume 7, MUP, 1979, pp 634–635

1859 births
1937 deaths
People educated at Prince Alfred College
Australian geologists
Australian anthropologists
Alumni of University College London
Fellows of the Geological Society of London
Burials at West Terrace Cemetery
People from Burra, South Australia